Mosad Mosbah (born 20 September 1957) is an Egyptian weightlifter. He competed in the men's super heavyweight event at the 1984 Summer Olympics.

References

1957 births
Living people
Egyptian male weightlifters
Olympic weightlifters of Egypt
Weightlifters at the 1984 Summer Olympics
Place of birth missing (living people)